Iran route numbering system is a network of highways and roads in Iran that is managed by Iran Road Maintenance & Transportation Organization. The network comprises main highways and several major and minor country roads.

History
Probably in the late 1990s, all road numbers were changed. The old system was also a grid, but with only 5 east-west routes (even numbers 2-10) and only 7 north-south routes (odd numbers 1-13). Therefore, the new system is a lot denser, though there are a few sections that used to have a number that is not numbered anymore.

Route signs
blue on motorways, green on other roads. 3-digit numbers appear in black on a white rectangle

Routes

Asian Highways

Motorway (Freeway)

Numbers roughly increase from west to east .

 
 
 
 , under construction
 
 , (Hamedan-Kermanshah-Khosravi) planned
 
 , under construction
 , Partly built
 , under construction

National highway

Odd numbers (11-99) generally denote north-south routes, while even numbers (12-98) denote east-west routes. Numbers increase in eastbound and southbound direction respectively. There are some A roads without a national number. Motorways do not have national numbers.
3-digit numbers are derived from 2-digit numbers by adding a digit at the end.

 
 
 
   (Sari-Tehran) Some parts of it under construction
 
 
 
 
  Turkmenistan-Mashhad-Mazandaran
  Bardaskan-Taybad
  Tehran-Mashhad

References
 Iran Road Maintenance & Transportation Organization
 Road management center of Iran
 Ministry of Roads & Urban Development of Iran  

Iran
Highways in Iran
Highways
Highways
Highways